Somporn Wannaprapa (born May 7, 1988) is a member of the Thailand men's national volleyball team. He won the silver medal at the 2009 Southeast Asian Games. He participated at the 2010 Asian Games. On club level he played for Federbrau in 2010.

Personal life
Somporn Wannaprapa married Amporn Hyapha in 2014.

Club 
  Federbrau (2010)
  Nakhonnon 3BB Suandusit (2014–2015)
  Nakhon Ratchasima (2016–2018)

Awards

Individual 
 2014–15 Thailand League "Best Opposite Hitter"

Club 
 2016–17 Thailand League -  Runner-up, with Nakhon Ratchasima
 2017 Thai-Denmark Super League -  Champion, with Nakhon Ratchasima
 2017–18 Thailand League -  Champion, with Nakhon Ratchasima
 2018 Thai-Denmark Super League -  Bronze Medal, with Nakhon Ratchasima

References

1988 births
Living people
Somporn Wannaprapa
Volleyball players at the 2010 Asian Games
Somporn Wannaprapa
Southeast Asian Games medalists in volleyball
Competitors at the 2009 Southeast Asian Games
Somporn Wannaprapa
Somporn Wannaprapa